North Park is a neighborhood within the City of Buffalo in New York State. It is one of several neighborhoods that comprise the larger community of North Buffalo. The neighborhood's borders are roughly Delaware Avenue to the west, The former DL&W railroad to the north and east, and the Beltline Railroad and the Central Park neighborhood to the South.

Notable businesses and institutions
These businesses and institutions utilizing the North Park name:

North Park Community School (Public School 50) - Formerly known as North Park Academy (Public School 66)
North Park Theatre
North Park Branch of the Buffalo & Erie County Public Library system.
North Park Lutheran Church
North Park Branch - Bank of America
North Park Florists
North Park Community Preschool
Hertel North Park Youth Baseball
North Park Station (former Beltline railroad station)

See also
Neighborhoods of Buffalo, New York

External links
 Data on this neighborhood

References

Neighborhoods in Buffalo, New York